The 4 Hours of Estoril was a sports car endurance race held at the Autódromo do Estoril in Estoril, on the Portuguese Riviera.  The race was first held in 1977 as a round of the World Sportscar Championship.  It was revived in 2001 for the European Le Mans Series as a 6-hour race, and continued until 2003 under the FIA Sportscar Championship. Between 2014 and 2016, the race was a part of the European Le Mans Series, in the format of 4 hours.

Results

External links
Racing Sports Cars: Estoril archive

 
Recurring sporting events established in 1977